Jan Prušinovský (born 3 July 1979 in Hořovice) is a Czech director and screenwriter.

In 2013, he was nominated for Czech Lion award as Best Director for Okresní přebor - Poslední zápas Pepika Hnátka and the film itself was nominated as the Czech Best Film. He won Czech Lion Awards as Best Director for The Snake Brothers (Kobry a užovky) in 2016, the film itself won the award for Best Czech Film.

Filmography
2005: Nejlepší je pěnivá, student film
2006: Rafťáci, screenwriter
2008: František je děvkař, screenwriter and director 
2010: Okresní přebor, TV series – screenwriter and director 
2012: Okresní přebor - Poslední zápas Pepika Hnátka, screenwriter and director 
2014: Čtvrtá hvězda, TV series 
2015: The Snake Brothers
2015: Autobazar Monte Karlo, series
2016: Trpaslík, TV series

References

External links

Czech-Slovak film database: Jan Prušinovský page 

Czech film directors
1979 births
Living people
People from Hořovice
Czech screenwriters
Male screenwriters